Waldemar Grzegorz Buda (born  in Turek, Poland) is a Polish politician who has been serving as Minister of Economic Development and Technology under Prime Minister Mateusz Morawiecki in his second cabinet since .

Early life and education 
He graduated from the faculty of law and administration at the University of Łódź in 2006.

Career 

Buda became a Łódź city councillor in 2014.

Personal life 

Waldemar Buda is married and has two children.  He runs in his spare time, and organizes an annual charity pilgrimage run to Częstochowa.

References

External links 
 Ministerial profile on gov.pl

1982 births
Living people
21st-century Polish politicians
Government ministers of Poland
University of Łódź alumni

pl:Waldemar Buda